Pervomaysky is a rural locality (a settlement) in Andreyevskoye Rural Settlement, Vashkinsky District, Vologda Oblast, Russia. The population was 483 as of 2002. There are 9 streets.

Geography 
Pervomaysky is located 27 km north of Lipin Bor (the district's administrative centre) by road. Davydovo is the nearest rural locality.

References 

Rural localities in Vashkinsky District